CAP-Gly domain-containing linker protein 2 is a protein that in humans is encoded by the CLIP2 gene.

The protein encoded by this gene belongs to the family of cytoplasmic linker proteins, which have been proposed to mediate the interaction between specific membranous organelles and microtubules. This protein was found to associate with both microtubules and an organelle called the dendritic lamellar body. This gene is hemizygously deleted in Williams syndrome, a multisystem developmental disorder caused by the deletion of contiguous genes at 7q11.23. Alternative splicing of this gene generates 2 transcript variants.

References

External links

Further reading